Pike County is a county on the eastern border of the U.S. state of Missouri, bounded by the Mississippi River. As of the 2010 census, the population was 18,516. Its county seat is Bowling Green. Its namesake was a city in middle Kentucky, a region from where many early migrants came. The county was organized December 14, 1818, and named for explorer Zebulon Pike. The folksong "Sweet Betsy from Pike" is generally thought to be associated with Pike County, Missouri.

Pike County is said to be the home of Momo (The Missouri Monster). The first reported sightings in the 1970s were traced to various locations throughout the county.

History
The history of Pike County is complicated by the fact that at its establishment in 1818, it included today's boundaries plus all counties north of it, plus the counties bordering all of them on the west, in total over 6 or 7 times larger than its current size, and thus covering the northeast border area of today's State of Missouri. Pike county and the counties north of it were gradually reduced in size by the creation of Ralls and subsequent new counties including Marion, Lewis, Clark, Scotland, Knox, Shelby, and Monroe.

The county was first settled by migrants from the Upper South. Some, though not all, were sympathetic to the Confederate cause in later decades. After the end of the post-Civil-War Reconstruction era, some of the county's inhabitants enforced Jim Crow laws and racial segregation in the county to maintain what has been labeled by some as "white supremacy". This occurred despite the fact that key US/Unionist military operations to control "Confederate" upstarts were launched from Pike County and had bases there.

In a violent period near the turn of the 20th century, five African Americans were tragically lynched in Pike County between 1891 and 1914. Among those were Curtis and Sam Young, who were both lynched for allegedly murdering the city marshall, Walter Meloan, on June 6, 1898, in Clarksville, a small town on the Mississippi River.  Pike tied with Howard County, Missouri for the highest number of lynchings of African Americans in the state during this historical period.

Geography

Adjacent counties
Ralls County (northwest)
Pike County, Illinois (northeast)
Calhoun County, Illinois (east)
Lincoln County (south)
Montgomery County (southwest)
Audrain County (west)

Major highways

 Great River Road

Former roadways

Red Ball Route

Mississippi River Scenic Route

 Route 9

Route 22

 Route 29

National protected area
Clarence Cannon National Wildlife Refuge

Demographics

As of the census of 2010, there were 18,516 people, 6,451 households, and 4,476 families residing in the county.  The population density was 27 people per square mile (11/km2).  There were 7,493 housing units at an average density of 11 per square mile (4/km2).  The racial makeup of the county was 88.44% White, 9.17% Black or African American, 0.24% Native American, 0.15% Asian, 0.04% Pacific Islander, 0.92% from other races, and 1.04% from two or more races. Approximately 1.61% of the population were Hispanic or Latino of any race. 24.6% were of American, 24.5% German, 8.9% English and 8.5% Irish ancestry.

There were 6,451 households, out of which 31.30% had children under the age of 18 living with them, 55.70% were married couples living together, 9.60% had a female householder with no husband present, and 30.60% were non-families. 26.70% of all households were made up of individuals, and 12.90% had someone living alone who was 65 years of age or older.  The average household size was 2.50 and the average family size was 3.01.

In the county, the population was spread out, with 23.40% under the age of 18, 9.10% from 18 to 24, 29.80% from 25 to 44, 22.80% from 45 to 64, and 15.00% who were 65 years of age or older.  The median age was 38 years. For every 100 females there were 119.20 males.  For every 100 females age 18 and over, there were 123.80 males.

The median income for a household in the county was $32,373, and the median income for a family was $39,059. Males had a median income of $28,528 versus $19,426 for females. The per capita income for the county was $14,462.  15.50% of the population and 11.90% of families were below the poverty line. 20.20% of those under the age of 18 and 15.20% of those 65 and older were living below the poverty line.

2020 Census

Education

Public schools
Boncl R-X School District – Louisiana
Boncl Elementary School (PK-08) 
 Bowling Green R-I School District – Bowling Green 
Bowling Green Elementary School (PK-05) 
Frankford Elementary School (K-05) 
Bowling Green Middle School (06-08) 
Bowling Green High School (09-12) 
 Louisiana R-II School District – Louisiana
Louisiana Elementary School (PK-05) 
Louisiana Middle School (06-08) 
Louisiana High School (09-12) 
 Pike County R-III School District – Clarksville 
Clopton Elementary School (PK-06) 
Clopton High School (07-12)

Private schools
Pike County Christian School – Curryville (K-11) – Baptist 
St. Clement School – Bowling Green (K-09) – Roman Catholic

Public libraries
Bowling Green Free Public Library
Clarksville Public Library
 Louisiana Public Library

Politics

Local
The Republican Party predominantly controls politics at the county level in Pike County, with Republicans holding many of the elected positions, with exceptions as stated below.  Note that, per the tables below, Republican Pike County voters prevailed in Missouri gubernatorial elections of 2016 and 2004, and came close to a tie for dominance in 2012, followed by a clear overtaking of county politics in 2016, in contrast with a tradition of nominal Democratic party affiliations of county-level officials.

State

Pike County is a part of Missouri's 40th District in the Missouri House of Representatives and is represented by Jim Hansen (R-Frankford).

Pike County is a part of Missouri's 18th District in the Missouri Senate and is currently represented by Brian Munzlinger (R-Williamstown).

Federal

Pike County is included in Missouri's 6th Congressional District and is currently represented by Sam Graves (R-Tarkio) in the U.S. House of Representatives.

Missouri presidential preference primary (2008)

Former U.S. Senator Hillary Clinton (D-New York) received more votes, a total of 1,447, than any candidate from either party in Pike County during the 2008 presidential primary. She also received more votes individually than the entire number of votes cast in the Republican Primary in Pike County.

Communities

Cities
Bowling Green (county seat)
Clarksville
Curryville
Frankford
Louisiana

Villages
Annada
Ashburn
Eolia
Paynesville
Tarrants

Census-designated places
Ashley
St. Clement

Other unincorporated places

Booth
Calumet
Cyrene
Edgewood
Estes
Farmer
Gazette
Kissenger
McCune
McIntosh
New Harmony
New Hartford
Sledd
Spencerburg
Stark
Vera

See also
National Register of Historic Places listings in Pike County, Missouri

References

External links
 Digitized 1930 Plat Book of Pike County  from University of Missouri Division of Special Collections, Archives, and Rare Books
Pike County website linking to government agencies: http://www.pikecountymo.net/
 [www.pikecountymo.org/ Pike County Development Authority]

 
1818 establishments in Missouri Territory
Populated places established in 1818
Missouri counties on the Mississippi River